HMS Amazon was the first Type 21 frigate of the Royal Navy. Her keel was laid down at the Vosper Thornycroft shipyard in Southampton, England. The ship suffered a fire in the Far East in 1977, drawing attention to the risk of building warships with aluminium superstructure.

Design
The contract for the design of the class was placed with the commercial shipbuilder Vosper Thornycroft, with the intent that the design would be cheaper than those produced by the Royal Navy's own design staff, while being attractive for export buyers.

Design displacement was  normal and  full load.

As built, armament consisted of a single 4.5 inch Mark 8 naval gun forward, and a four-round launcher for the Sea Cat surface-to-air missile aft, backed up by two 20mm cannon. A hangar and flight deck for a single light helicopter, intended to be the new Westland Lynx (although Amazon was first equipped with a Westland Wasp as the Lynx had not yet entered service). A Type 992Q surface/air search and target indication radar was fitted, together with a Type 978 navigation radar. Two Type 912 fire control radars (the Italian Selenia RTX-10X) directed the ship's gun and the Seacat, while a Type 184M medium range search sonar and a Type 162M bottom search sonar (modernised versions of the sonars used on the Leander-class) were fitted.

Later ships of the class completed with four Exocet anti-ship missiles forward, and two triple tubes for United States USN/NATO-standard Mark 44 or Mark 46 torpedoes, but Amazon did not receive Exocet until 1984–1985.

Construction
Amazon, the first of her class, was ordered on 26 March 1969. She was laid down at Vosper Thornycroft's Woolston, Southampton shipyard on 6 November 1969 and was launched by Princess Anne on 26 April 1971. Construction was slow, and Amazon was not completed until 11 May 1974, at a cost of £16.8 million.

Royal Navy Service
In June 1977 Amazon took part in the Fleet Review, of the Royal Navy at Spithead in celebration of HM the Queen's Silver Jubilee, while in July she carried out successful trials with the Lynx helicopter. In November 1977 Amazon suffered serious engine room fire caused by a fuel leak when near Singapore. Ladders made of aluminium alloy melted in the fire, making it difficult to respond, which was one of the reasons why use of aluminum as a construction material for warships went out of fashion with the Royal Navy. From 1978 Amazons Wasp helicopter was replaced by a Lynx.

In December 1980 the ship struck a coral pinnacle off Belize. Amazon was the only unit of her class to not participate in the Falklands War, as she was in the Persian Gulf at the time, although she carried out a patrol in the South Atlantic in August–November 1982.

By the mid-1980s the surviving Type 21s were suffering cracking in the hull and so she was taken in for refitting, with a steel plate being welded down each side of the ship. At the same time modifications were made to reduce hull noise. Four Exocet launchers were also fitted in 'B' position, the last of the class to be so fitted.

Pakistan Navy Service

Amazon decommissioned and was sold to Pakistan on 30 September 1993, being renamed PNS Babur. Exocet was not transferred to Pakistan and Babur had her obsolete Sea Cat launcher removed. Two quadruple Harpoon missile launchers were fitted in place of the Exocet launchers. Signaal DA08 air search radar replaced the Type 992 and SRBOC chaff launchers and 20 mm and 30 mm guns were fitted.

On 3 August 2011, a video surfaced on the Internet reportedly showing Babur brushing against the Indian frigate  in the Gulf of Aden during the rescue of hostages on-board merchant vessel MV Suez in June.

After serving 22 years of military service, Babur was retired and decommissioned from service in December 2014.

Commanding officers

References

Publications

 

 

 

Type 21 frigates
1971 ships
Frigates of the Pakistan Navy